Victoria Escarlata Bernard (born 17 March 1989 in Las Palmas) is a Spanish backstroke swimmer who competed in the 2008 Summer Olympics.

References

External links
 
 
 
 

1989 births
Living people
Spanish female backstroke swimmers
Olympic swimmers of Spain
Swimmers at the 2008 Summer Olympics
20th-century Spanish women
21st-century Spanish women